Napoleon and Josephine may refer to:

 The romantic relationship between Napoleon Bonaparte and Joséphine de Beauharnais from 1795 to 1814
 Napoleon and Josephine, a 1965 historical novel by Frances Mossiker
 Napoleon and Josephine: A Love Story, a 1987 television miniseries
 Napoleon & Josephine (Sun City Girls Singles Volume 2), a 2009 compilation album by Sun City Girls

See also
 Josephine (disambiguation)
 Napoleon (disambiguation)